The 2001 Tirreno–Adriatico was the 36th edition of the Tirreno–Adriatico cycle race and was held from 14 March to 21 March 2001. The race started in Sorrento and finished in San Benedetto del Tronto. The race was won by Davide Rebellin of the Liquigas–Pata team.

General classification

References

2001
2001 in Italian sport